Fairview is a census-designated place (CDP) in Alameda County, California, United States. It borders on the city of Hayward and the census-designated place of Castro Valley. The population was 11,341 at the 2020 census.

Geography

Demographics

2010
The 2010 United States Census reported that 10,003 people, 3,490 households, and 2,512 families resided in the CDP. The racial makeup of the CDP was 45.0% White (36.2% non-Hispanic), 21.0% African American (20.5% non-Hispanic), 0.8% Native American, 15.2% Asian, 1.3% Pacific Islander, 9.1% from other races, and 7.6% from two or more races. 21.7% of the population was Hispanic or Latino of any race.

The Census reported that 98.5% of the population lived in households, 0.8% lived in non-institutionalized group quarters, and 0.7% were institutionalized.

There were 3,490 households, out of which 33.2% had children under the age of 18 living in them, 51.9% were opposite-sex married couples living together, 14.1% had a female householder with no husband present, and 6.0% had a male householder with no wife present. 5.6% of households were unmarried opposite-sex partnerships and 1.4% were same-sex married couples or partnerships. 20.2% of households were made up of individuals, and 6.8% had someone living alone who was 65 years of age or older. The average household size was 2.82 and the average family size was 3.24.

The population was spread out, with 20.7% under the age of 18, 8.4% aged 18 to 24, 26.3% aged 25 to 44, 31.9% aged 45 to 64, and 12.8% who were 65 years of age or older. The median age was 41.1 years. For every 100 females, there were 97.9 males. For every 100 females age 18 and over, there were 94.7 males.

There were 3,642 housing units, of which 3,490 were occupied, of which 78.0% were owner-occupied and 22.0% were occupied by renters. The homeowner vacancy rate was 1.8%; the rental vacancy rate was 5.1%. 75.9% of the population lived in owner-occupied housing units and 22.6% lived in rental housing units.

2000
As of the census of 2000, there were 9,470 people, 3,281 households, and 2,427 families living in the CDP.

There were 3,281 households, out of which 32.7% had children under the age of 18 living with them, 58.2% were married couples living together, 11.6% had a female householder with no husband present, and 26.0% were non-families. 18.0% of all households were made up of individuals, and 6.0% had someone living alone who was 65 years of age or older.  The average household size was 2.84 and the average family size was 3.22.

In the CDP, the population was spread out, with 24.1% under the age of 18, 7.1% from 18 to 24, 30.1% from 25 to 44, 26.9% from 45 to 64, and 11.8% who were 65 years of age or older.  The median age was 39 years. For every 100 females, there were 98.1 males.  For every 100 females age 18 and over, there were 96.1 males.

The median income for a household in the CDP was $76,647, and the median income for a family was $84,027. Males had a median income of $50,705 versus $41,599 for females. The per capita income for the CDP was $28,950.  About 2.6% of families and 6.4% of the population were below the poverty line, including 4.5% of those under age 18 and 5.0% of those age 65 or over.

Services 
The Fairview Fire Protection District operates in Fairview. It is an independent special fire district in Alameda County, contracting with Hayward for emergency medical  and other services, and has a fire station on Fairview Avenue. It has been in operation since 1938.

Lone Tree Cemetery is located there, though it is often considered as being located in nearby Hayward, and is the burial site for William Dutton Hayward, the namesake of Hayward.

References

External links

Census-designated places in Alameda County, California
Census-designated places in California